Free Time is an album by the female Japanese rock trio Shonen Knife. It was released in Japan on January 6, 2010. An English version was released in the United States on November 9, 2010, by Good Charamel Records. It was released in Europe on July 11, 2011, with different cover art.

Track listing
 "Perfect Freedom"
 "Rock 'n' Roll Cake"
 "Economic Crisis"
 "Do You Happen to Know"
 "Capybara"
 "An Old Stationary Shop"
 "Monster Jellyfish"
 "P.Y.O."
 "Love Song"
 "Star"

The English version CD, for the United States and Europe, has English versions of all the above songs, plus two extra songs:

"Rock N Roll Cake" (Alternative Version)
"Capybara" (Techno Version)

Personnel 
Naoko Yamano - guitar, vocals
Ritsuko Taneda - bass, backing vocals
Etsuko Nakanishi - drums, backing vocals

References

External links
 Jrawk review of the album
 Official Shonen Knife website (in Japanese and English)

Shonen Knife albums
2009 albums
P-Vine Records albums